Mugu may refer to:

 Mugu District, one of the seventy-seven districts of Nepal
 Point Mugu, California
 Point Mugu State Park
 Naval Air Station Point Mugu
 A nickname for Spanish-Venezuelan professional tennis player Garbiñe Muguruza